Anil Srivastava (born in Varanasi) is an Indian politician and district president of the Indian National Congress, Varanasi.His political party is the Indian National Congress.

Early life and career
Anil Srivastava was born in Varanasi. Anil Srivastava attended Banaras Hindu University from 1978 to 1985 for graduation and post graduation. Since his early days he was passionate about social work. In his pursuit of passion, he actively participated in the politics since school days. He served many political offices in his graduation days. He was elected president of Banaras Hindu University with highest vote margin ever till date. He was popular among all sections of society.
Impressed by Anil Srivastava's passionate work, Rajiv Gandhi invited him to join NSUI subsequently to NYC

Political career
Anil Srivastava ran a state level campaign, in Uttar Pradesh to save student unions in the reign of Veer Bhadra Singh and forayed into the nation scene of the active politics.

He is a prominent figure in the campaign of UP Assembly elections. Party always value him as an observer in all the student organization elections not only in UP but also for Delhi University Student Union (DUSU).

In 2010, Anil Srivastava has been elected president of Varanasi District, Indian National Congress.

Anil Srivastav lost 2017 Uttar Pradesh Vidhan Sabha elections on congress ticket from Varanasi cantonment constituency.

Youth politics
In his attempt to prove himself as a youth leader he was an active participant in Indian Youth Congress (IYC), an organisation that he has been keen to transform since he was appointed secretary in September 1987.

Under Anil Srivastava, IYC and NSUI have done tremendous work in the interest of youth specially students.

Anil Srivastava several times participated in interactive sessions with various students of Banaras Hindu University, India.  He always makes it a point to help all the sections of the society in day-to-day activities as he has been very passionate to work with people. His vision to see Uttar Pradesh on National Map is truly majestic. His road map will be a milestone in the development of UP.

See also
 Political Families of The World

References

External links

Indian National Congress politicians from Uttar Pradesh
Banaras Hindu University alumni
Politicians from Varanasi
Living people
Year of birth missing (living people)